The under-five mortality rate (U5MR) is the number of deaths of infants and children under five years old per 1000 live births. The under-five mortality rate for the world is 39 deaths according to the World Bank and the World Health Organization (WHO). 5.3 million children under age five died in 2018, 14,722 every day.

The infant mortality rate is the number of deaths of infants under one year old per 1,000 live births. This rate is often used as an indicator of the level of health in a country. The infant mortality rate of the world in 2019 was 28 according to the United Nations and the projected estimate for 2020 was 30.8 according to the CIA World Factbook.

Note that due to differences in reporting, these numbers may not be comparable across countries. The WHO recommendation is that all children who show signs of life should be recorded as live births. In many countries this standard is not followed, artificially lowering their infant mortality rates relative to countries which follow those standards.

Under-five mortality from the World Bank
World average of Under-five mortality rate is 36.6 per 1000 live births, according to 2020 estimates.

* indicates "Health in COUNTRY or TERRITORY" links.

OECD. Under-five mortality from the World Bank 

The following is a list of OECD countries and their under-five mortality rate per 1000 live births as published by the World Bank.

* indicates "Health in COUNTRY or TERRITORY" links.

Infant mortality from the CIA World Factbook
Note: The link in the last column takes you to the same country in the UN table in the next section.

* indicates "Health in COUNTRY or TERRITORY" links.

Infant mortality from the United Nations population division (from birth to 1 year-olds only)
Note: The link in the last column takes you to the same country in the CIA table in the previous section.

* indicates "Health in COUNTRY or TERRITORY" links.

Notes

See also
 List of countries by maternal mortality ratio
 Global Newborn Society

References

Further reading 
CME Info - Child Mortality Estimates. UNICEF.

Death of children
Infant mortality
Infant mortality
Demographic lists
Infant mortality
Infant mortality